The 2013 European Junior Curling Challenge was held from January 3 to 8 at the Curling Hall Roztyly in Prague, Czech Republic. Nations in the Europe zone that have not already qualified for the World Junior Curling Championships participated in the curling challenge. The top finishers of each tournament will advance to the 2013 World Junior Curling Championships in Sochi, Russia. In the men's tournament, Italy regained a spot in the World Junior Championships after a last place finish at last year's worlds with a win over Denmark. In the women's tournament, Denmark won a spot in the World Junior Championships with a win over Hungary.

Men

Teams
The teams are listed as follows:

Round-robin standings
Final round-robin standings

Round-robin results
All draw times are listed in Central European Time (UTC+1).

Group A

Draw 1
Thursday, January 3, 19:00

Draw 2
Friday, January 4, 12:30

Draw 3
Friday, January 4, 19:30

Draw 4
Saturday, January 5, 12:30

Draw 5
Saturday, January 5, 19:30

Draw 6
Sunday, January 6, 9:00

Draw 7
Sunday, January 6, 16:00

Draw 8
Monday, January 7, 9:00

Draw 9
Monday, January 7, 16:00

Group B

Draw 1
Thursday, January 3, 19:00

Draw 2
Friday, January 4, 12:30

Draw 3
Friday, January 4, 19:30

Draw 4
Saturday, January 5, 12:30

Draw 5
Saturday, January 5, 19:30

Draw 6
Sunday, January 6, 9:00

Draw 7
Sunday, January 6, 16:00

Draw 8
Monday, January 7, 9:00

Draw 9
Monday, January 7, 16:00

Tiebreakers
Tuesday, January 8, 8:00

Playoffs

Semifinals
Tuesday, January 8, 11:30

Final
Tuesday, January 8, 15:30

Women

Teams
The teams are listed as follows:

Round-robin standings
As of Draw 7

Round-robin results
All draw times listed in Central European Time (UTC+1).

Group A

Draw 1
Friday, January 4, 9:00

Draw 3
Saturday, January 5, 9:00

Draw 4
Saturday, January 5, 16:00

Draw 5
Sunday, January 6, 12:30

Draw 6
Sunday, January 6, 19:30

Draw 7
Monday, January 7, 12:30

Draw 8
Monday, January 7, 19:30

Group B

Draw 1
Friday, January 4, 9:00

Draw 2
Friday, January 4, 16:00

Draw 3
Saturday, January 5, 9:00

Draw 4
Saturday, January 5, 16:00

Draw 5
Sunday, January 6, 12:30

Draw 6
Sunday, January 6, 19:30

Draw 7
Monday, January 7, 12:30

Draw 8
Monday, January 7, 19:30

Playoffs

Semifinals
Tuesday, January 8, 11:30

Final
Tuesday, January 8, 15:30

References

External links

European Junior Challenge
European Junior Curling Challenge
European Junior Curling Challenge, 2013
European Junior Curling Challenge, 2013
2013
European Junior Curling
European Junior Curling Challenge